East of Fifth Avenue is a 1933 American drama film directed by Albert S. Rogell and starring Wallace Ford, Mary Carlisle and Dorothy Tree. It was produced and distributed by Columbia Pictures. The plot revolves around the inhabitants of a cheap New York boarding house.

Cast
 Wallace Ford as Vic Howard
 Mary Carlisle as Edna Howard
 Dorothy Tree as Kitty Green
 Walter Connolly as John Lawton
 Louise Carter as Mrs. Mary Lawton
 Walter Byron as Paul Baxter
 Lucien Littlefield as Gardner
 Harry Holman as Sam Cronin
 Maude Eburne as Mrs. Conway
 Fern Emmett as Lizzie
 Bradley Page as Nick
 Willard Robertson as Dr. Morgan
 Kate Campbell as Miss Smythe
 Eddy Chandler as Tenement Residen
 Dorothy Vernon as Tenement Resident

References

Bibliography
 Dick, Bernard F. Columbia Pictures: Portrait of a Studio. University Press of Kentucky, 2015.

External links
 

1933 films
1933 drama films
1930s English-language films
American drama films
Films directed by Albert S. Rogell
Films set in New York City
Films with screenplays by Jo Swerling
American black-and-white films
Columbia Pictures films
1930s American films